Shut Up and Kiss Me is a 2004 romantic comedy film starring Christopher Daniel Barnes, Kristin Richardson, Krista Allen, and Brad Rowe. It was written by Steven Chase and Howard Flamm and directed by Gary Brockette.

Cast
Christopher Daniel Barnes as Bryan Ballister
Brad Rowe as Pete Waddle
Kristin Richardson as Jessica Preston
Krista Allen as Tiara Benedette
Victoria Jackson as Harriet Ballister
Leo Rossi as Mario
Burt Young as Vincent Bublioni
John Capodice as Mr. Grummace
Frank Bonner as Harvey Ballister
Veronica De Laurentiis as Aunt Isabella
Tim Ware as Police Officer
Kevin Meaney as Judge Walter Kapinsky

References

External links
 
 
 

2004 films
2004 romantic comedy films
American romantic comedy films
2000s English-language films
2000s American films